Claverack College, also known as Washington Seminary and Hudson River Institute, was a coeducational boarding school in Claverack, New York, United States. It was in operation from 1779 until 1902.

History
The school was founded as the Washington Seminary during the American Revolution in 1779 by Rev. John Gabriel Gebhard, the pastor of the Reformed Dutch Church of Claverack.  In 1830 the school was renamed Claverack Academy and in 1854 it became Claverack College (a quasi-military academy for boys) and Hudson River Institute (a school for girls).

In 1890, one of its students named Stephen Crane, who later became a prominent author, published his first article in the February 1890 Claverack College Vidette about the explorer Henry M. Stanley's quest to find the English missionary David Livingstone in Africa.

In the 1870s it was not uncommon for the Claverack men to marry the women of Hudson River Institute. One such marriage was Edward George Johnson, son of a Manhattan businessman, and Eugenia Ramacciotti, daughter of Francis Ramacciotti. Tuition in 1875 was $400 per year, which was equivalent of a year's pay for most people. Its  campus was on the east side of what is today NY 9H just south of the Reformed Dutch Church of Claverack.

Claverack College closed in 1902. After its closure the land was divided and sold and the buildings razed. The George Felpel House, currently on the western half of the property, uses some of the school buildings' stones.

Notable alumni and faculty
 
 Richard M. Blatchford, U.S. Army general in World War I
 John Clum, Apache Indian Agent, publisher of The Tombstone Epitaph, mayor of Tombstone, Arizona, and friend of Virgil and Wyatt Earp.
 Stephen Crane, author (said his time at Claverack was among the happiest in his life)
 Wm. Knight, Wisconsin businessman and elected official
 Killian Miller, U.S. Representative
 Robert H. Morris (mayor), mayor of New York City
 Margaret Sanger, women's rights advocate
 Martin Van Buren, 8th U.S. President
 General John P. Van Ness, U.S. Representative
 William P. Van Ness, U.S. District Judge
 Cornelius P. Van Ness, Governor of Vermont
 General Jacob Rutsen Van Rensselaer, New York Secretary of State
 Ada Josephine Todd (1858-1904), author and educator
 Alexander Russell Webb, U.S. Ambassador to Philippines, early American Muslim

References

External links
Gazetteer and business directory of Columbia County, N.Y. for 1871-2 (Printed at the Journal office, 1871), pg. 106-108

Defunct schools in New York (state)
Boarding schools in New York (state)
Organizations established in 1779
1902 disestablishments in New York (state)
Claverack, New York
1779 establishments in New York (state)